The 1943–44 LFF Lyga was the 23rd season of the LFF Lyga football competition in Lithuania. It was abandoned.

League standings

References
RSSSF

LFF Lyga seasons
1943 in Lithuanian football
1944 in Lithuanian football
Lith
Lith